Pastrmalija or colloquially Pastrmajlija is a Macedonian bread pie made from dough and meat. Pastrmalija is usually oval-shaped with sliced meat cubes on top of it. Its name derives from the word pastrma, meaning salted and dried meat of sheep or lamb (cf. "pastırma"). It is based on the Turkish İçli Pide. Although it is officially called pastrmalija, a popular name among the Macedonian people is "pastrmajlija", only adding the letter "j".

In its honor, the city of Štip organizes an annual festival called "Pastrmalijada".

See also
 Etli ekmek
 Khachapuri
 Cantiq

References

Macedonian cuisine
Savoury pies
Turkish cuisine
Tatar cuisine
Sveti Nikole Municipality
Štip Municipality
Veles Municipality